The Bréguet Bre.V B.2 bomber and Bréguet Bre.V Ca.2 escort fighter were French biplanes of World War I which were developments of the Bréguet Bre.IV bomber.  The Bre.VI and Bre.XII were, in turn, developments of the Bre.V

Design and development
This aircraft was a refinement of the escort fighter that Breguet Aviation had designed and was manufactured by Michelin as the Breguet-Michelin BUC. Initially intended to carry the same  Hotchkiss cannon that armed the BUC, the Bre.5 was revised at the request of the French Army to carry a  Lewis Gun fired rearward from atop the biplane's upper wing.

Operational history
 
A small number of cannon-armed machines were produced from April 1916 onwards and allotted to bomber units. The British Royal Naval Air Service operated 35 of which ten came from Bréguet, and 25 were built in the United Kingdom by Grahame-White as the G.W.19.

The Bre.6 was similar, but powered by a buried  Canton-Unné A9 radial engine, and was developed in case production of the Bre.5's Renault engine was unable to keep up with demand. It was also produced both as an escort fighter and as a bomber.

As the Bre.5 reached obsolescence, a number were rebuilt as Bre.12 night fighters and night bombers. The fighter carried a  cannon and a searchlight, and had a double nosewheel distinguishing it from previous versions.

Variants
Bre.5
Renault-powered version.
Bre 5 B.2
Bomber version.
Bre.5 Ca.2
Cannon-armed escort fighter version.
Grahame White G.W.19
British-built version for RNAS with Rolls-Royce Falcon engine.
Bre.6
Canton-Unné-powered version.
Bre.6 B.2
Bomber version.
Bre.6Ca.2
Cannon-armed escort fighter.
Bre.12
Bre.5s remanufactured for night fighting
Bre.12 B.2
Night bomber.
Bre.12 Ca.2
Cannon-armed night fighter.

Operators

French Army

Romanian Air Corps

Royal Naval Air Service

Specifications (Bre.5 Ca.2)

See also

References

Citations

Bibliography

 Angelucci, Enzo. The Rand McNally Encyclopedia of Military Aircraft, 1914-1980. San Diego, California: The Military Press, 1983. .
 Taylor, Michael J. H. Jane's Encyclopedia of Aviation. London: Studio Editions, 1989. .
 World Aircraft Information Files. London: Bright Star Publishing, p. File 890, Sheet 79.

Single-engined pusher aircraft
Biplanes
1910s French fighter aircraft
 0005
Aircraft first flown in 1915